The 2019 Dartmouth Big Green football team represented Dartmouth College in the 2019 NCAA Division I FCS football season as a member of the Ivy League. The Big Green were led by head coach Buddy Teevens in his 15th straight year and 20th overall. They played their home games at Memorial Field. They finished the season 9–1 overall and 6–1 in Ivy League play share of the Ivy League title with Yale. Dartmouth averaged 8,378 fans per game.

Previous season

The Big Green finished the 2018 season 9–1, 6–1 in Ivy League play to finish in second place.

Preseason

Preseason media poll
The Ivy League released their preseason media poll on August 8, 2019. The Big Green were picked to finish in second place.

Schedule

Game summaries

at Jacksonville

Colgate

at Penn

Yale

at Marist

Columbia

at Harvard

vs. Princeton

Cornell

at Brown

Ranking movements

References

Dartmouth
Dartmouth Big Green football seasons
Ivy League football champion seasons
Dartmouth Big Green football